Robert A. Wagner (born January 10, 1973) is an American Democratic politician currently serving as President of the Oregon State Senate. He represents the 19th district, which includes the cities of Durham, Lake Oswego, Rivergrove, Tualatin, West Linn, parts of southwest Portland and Tigard, as well as unincorporated parts of southwestern Clackamas County, eastern Washington County, and southern Multnomah County.

Early life and education
Wagner grew up in Lake Oswego and graduated from Lake Oswego High School. He studied at Wesleyan University and graduated from Portland State University with a degree in political science. He earned a masters in public policy from George Washington University.

Career 
He served as a director of political and legislative affairs for the American Federation of Teachers and was associate vice-president for advancement at Portland Community College, overseeing the foundation, marketing and public relations.

In December 2017, Wagner announced he left Portland Community College.

School Board
In May 2017, Wagner ran unopposed and was elected to the Lake Oswego School Board. In July 2019, he was elected by the school board as its chair for a one-year term. In May 2020, he announced that he would resign from the school board on June 22, 2020, citing demands of work required by his new position as the majority leader of the Oregon Senate.

State Senate
In January 2018, Wagner was appointed to fill the vacancy in District 19 of the Oregon Senate created when Richard Devlin was appointed to the Northwest Power and Conservation Council. Wagner continued his service on the school board while in the Senate.

In the 2018 Oregon legislative election, he defeated Republican David Poulson to earn a full Senate term.

In the Senate, Wagner served as chair of the Senate Education Committee.

Wagner was elected Senate Majority Leader in May 2020.

Personal life
Wagner lives with his wife and children in Lake Oswego.

References

External links
 Legislative website
 Campaign website

|-

1973 births
21st-century American politicians
Democratic Party Oregon state senators
George Washington University alumni
Living people
Politicians from Lake Oswego, Oregon
Portland State University alumni
School board members in Oregon